Bellot is a small lunar impact crater that is located on the southwest edge of Mare Fecunditatis. It lies between the craters Goclenius to the northwest and Crozier to the southeast. To the southwest is Colombo, and to the west is Magelhaens.

This crater is circular and bowl-shaped, with a small interior floor with inner sides that slope down relatively smoothly to the bottom. The inner walls have a higher albedo than the nearby lunar mare.

Satellite craters
By convention these features are identified on lunar maps by placing the letter on the side of the crater midpoint that is closest to Bellot.

References

 
 
 
 
 
 
 
 
 
 
 
 

Impact craters on the Moon